André Robin De Shields (born January 12, 1946) is an American actor, singer, dancer, director, and choreographer.

De Shields originated the role of Hermes on Broadway in the musical Hadestown, winning the 2019 Tony Award for Best Actor in a Featured Role in a Musical and the 2020 Grammy Award for Best Musical Theater Album for his performance. He has also appeared on television, and won a Primetime Emmy Award for Outstanding Individual Achievement for his performance in the 1982 NBC broadcast of Ain't Misbehavin'.

Early life and education
André Robin De Shields was born on January 12, 1946, in Dundalk, Maryland, to Mary Gunther and John De Shields. He was raised in Baltimore, Maryland, the ninth of eleven children; his father died at the age of 50, when André was 17. De Shields obtained his high school diploma at Baltimore City College in 1964, then attended Wilmington College, where he starred in a production of Lorraine Hansberry's A Raisin in the Sun. He then transferred colleges and earned his B.A. in English literature from the University of Wisconsin, Madison in 1970. In 1991, De Shields received his M.A. in African American studies from the Gallatin School of Individualized Study of New York University.

He currently serves as an adjunct professor at Gallatin.

Career
De Shields began his professional career in the 1969 Chicago production of Hair, which led to a role in The Me Nobody Knows and participation in Chicago's Organic Theater Company. He performed in a number of off-off-Broadway productions at La MaMa Experimental Theatre Club in the East Village of Manhattan during the 1970s, 1980s, and early 1990s. These included Ken Rubenstein's Sacred Guard (1973), Lamar Alford's Thoughts (1974), and the Cotton Club Gala with music by Aaron Bell and directed by Ellen Stewart (1985). He co-wrote (with Judith Cohen) and directed an evening of songs called Judith and the Cohen Sisters in Midnight in Manhattan at La MaMa in September/October 1984. He directed a production of Chico Kasinoir's The Adventures of Rhubarb: The Rock and Roll Rabbit in 1985 and a production of his own work, Saint Tous, to celebrate Black History Month at La MaMa in February 1991.

He made his Broadway debut as Xander in Stuart Gordon's 1973 Warp! and next appeared in Paul Jabara's 1973 Rachael Lily Rosenbloom (And Don't You Ever Forget It), which closed during previews. He then appeared in the title role of The Wiz, Charlie Smalls and William F. Brown's 1975 musical directed by Geoffrey Holder.

After choreographing two Bette Midler musicals, De Shields returned to Broadway to perform in the musical revue Ain't Misbehavin' in 1978. The original production ran for over 1,600 shows and De Shields earned a 1978 Drama Desk nomination for his performance. Three years later, he returned to Broadway to perform in Stardust: The Mitchell Parrish Musical, a musical revue featuring the lyricist's work with Hoagy Carmichael, Benny Goodman, Duke Ellington, and Leroy Anderson.

In 1984, De Shields wrote, choreographed, directed, and starred in André De Shields' Haarlem Nocturne, a Broadway musical revue featuring standards from the American songbook, pop hits from the early 1960s, and De Shields' own songs. The revue was produced at the Latin Quarter and at La MaMa (with music by Marc Shaiman). He appeared in a revival of Ain't Misbehavin' in 1988, and next appeared on Broadway in 1997 as the Jester in Play On!, a musical based on Ellington's songs. De Shields earned Tony and Drama Desk nominations for his performance.

In 2000, De Shields originated the role of Noah "Horse" T. Simmons in the Terrence McNally / David Yazbek musical adaptation of the film The Full Monty. As with Play On!, De Shields earned both Tony and Drama Desk nominations for this performance. In 2004, he appeared in the Broadway production of Mark Medoff's Prymate at the Longacre Theatre. In 2008, he received a Drama Desk nomination for his performance in an off-Broadway production of Langston Hughes' Black Nativity. In 2009, he appeared on Broadway opposite Joan Allen and Jeremy Irons in Impressionism. The play ran through May 2009 at the Gerald Schoenfeld Theater.

De Shields' regional theatre credits include Play On!, The Full Monty, Waiting For Godot, The Man Who Came to Dinner, Death of a Salesman, Dusyanta: A Tale of Kalidasa, The Gospel According to James, Camino Real and King Lear. In 2013, he portrayed Akela and King Louie in the world premiere of Mary Zimmerman's adaptation of Rudyard Kipling's The Jungle Book, a co-production of the Goodman Theatre and Huntington Theatre Company. De Shields received his 3rd Jeff Award (Outstanding Achievement in the category of Actor in a Supporting Role – Musical) for his role as King Louie, and garnered an Elliot Norton Awards nomination for Outstanding Musical Performance by an Actor as well as an IRNE Awards nomination for Best Supporting Actor – Musical.

De Shields has portrayed Barrett Rude Sr. in The Fortress of Solitude, the musical based on Jonathan Lethem's novel The Fortress of Solitude, since its inception in 2012 at Vassar College. The Fortress of Solitude premiered at the Dallas Theater Center in spring 2014, and the off-Broadway production of The Fortress of Solitude, co-produced with The Public Theater, ran through November 2014. De Shields, Lillias White, Stefanie Powers, and Georgia Engel starred in the new musical Gotta Dance, directed and choreographed by Jerry Mitchell. The musical began performances on December 13, 2015, at Chicago's Bank of America Theatre and ran through January 17, 2016.

He played Hermes in the Broadway musical Hadestown, which began previews on March 22, 2019, at the Walter Kerr Theatre. He received the Tony Award for Best Featured Actor in a Musical for Hadestown on his third nomination. He played his final performance on May 29, 2022. On January 26, 2021, it was announced that De Shields would reprise his role as Hermes in Live From Mount Olympus, a narrative podcast for tweens directed by Rachel Chavkin and Zhailon Levingston. The series was produced by The Onassis Foundation and TRAX from PRX. De Shields' co-stars include fellow Hadestown cast member Amber Gray, Divine Garland, Vinie Burrows, Kristen Sieh, and more.

De Shields has appeared on television on Another World, Cosby, Sex and the City, Great Performances, Lipstick Jungle, Law & Order, and Law & Order: Special Victims Unit. He won an Primetime Emmy Award for Outstanding Individual Achievement for his performance in the 1982 NBC broadcast of Ain't Misbehavin', and played Tweedledum in a 1983 televised production of Alice in Wonderland that also featured Eve Arden, Richard Burton, Colleen Dewhurst, James Coco, Kaye Ballard, and Nathan Lane. Most recently, De Shields appeared in John Mulaney's John Mulaney & the Sack Lunch Bunch in which he sang "Algebra Song!" The comedy/musical/variety special was released on Netflix on December 24, 2019. In 2020, he played the role of Chubby, a recurring character, in the television series Katy Keene on The CW.

On December 28, 2020, it was announced that De Shields will star as Anton Ego in a benefit concert presentation of Ratatouille the Musical, an internet meme that originated on TikTok, inspired by the 2007 Disney/Pixar film. The concert streamed exclusively on TodayTix on January 1, 2021. De Shields appeared in Lin-Manuel Miranda's directorial debut film, tick, tick... BOOM!, released on Netflix on November 12, 2021, as a patron of the Moondance Diner in the musical scene for "Sunday", as well as other Broadway actors such as Chita Rivera, Renée Elise Goldsberry, Phillipa Soo, among others. He also plays the significant supporting role of Jack in Netflix comedy Uncoupled, released in July 2022.

Personal life
De Shields is gay, but prefers to be described as "a Black man who is queer" or "a Black man who loves other men". He is also a "long-term survivor" of HIV, living with HIV for over 40 years, having been diagnosed during the early AIDS epidemic after noticing his lymph nodes were swollen when shaving before a Los Angeles performance on Ain't Misbehavins 1980 national tour and being formally diagnosed in 1991. His partner of 17 years, Chico Kasinoir, died in June 1992 of AIDS-related lymphoma. Another partner of De Shields', a man named John whom he was with for two years, died of AIDS-related meningitis in 1995.

Awards and nominations

References

External links
 André De Shields official website
 
 
 
De Shields' page on La MaMa Archives Digital Collections

1946 births
20th-century American dancers
20th-century American male actors
20th-century American singers
21st-century American dancers
21st-century American male actors
21st-century American singers
African-American choreographers
African-American male actors
African-American male dancers
20th-century African-American male singers
American choreographers
American male dancers
American male film actors
American male musical theatre actors
American male stage actors
American male television actors
Baltimore City College alumni
American gay actors
American gay musicians
Grammy Award winners
LGBT African Americans
LGBT dancers
LGBT people from Maryland
American LGBT singers
Living people
Male actors from Baltimore
Musicians from Baltimore
New York University alumni
People with HIV/AIDS
Primetime Emmy Award winners
Singers from Maryland
Tony Award winners
University of Wisconsin–Madison College of Letters and Science alumni
Writers from Baltimore
20th-century American male singers
21st-century American male singers
20th-century American LGBT people
21st-century American LGBT people
21st-century African-American male singers
Queer men
Queer musicians
Queer actors